Game Connect: Asia Pacific (GCAP) is Australia’s annual game development conference and networking event for the Asia Pacific Games Industry and is administered by the Game Developers’ Association of Australia.

See also
Australian Game Developers Conference

References

External links

 
 Game Developers' Association of Australia website

Video game development
Trade fairs in Australia